Villanueva State Park is a state park of New Mexico, United States, located on the banks of the Pecos River. The park features red and yellow sandstone cliffs, cottonwood trees, and other native plants. Villanueva State Park's elevation is 6,110 feet (1862 m) above sea level. The park sits in the shift from The Rocky Mountains and The Great Plains. The park is located southwest of the town of Las Vegas,  New Mexico. While on the lookout trails of Villanueva State Park, one would be able to view the Pecos River. Water in the Pecos River south headed to Villanueva State Park, there are showed signs of base metals and mercury. Elevated levels of copper, lead, and zinc.

Weather 
Villanueva State Park's weather stays in the moderate zone for New Mexico. December and January are the coldest months at the park being a low of 23F and a high of 49-50F. The warmest months for Villanueva State Park are in June and July, where the high is 90F and the low reaching 55-59F.

Villanueva State Park was established in 1967,  when land was donated by San Miguel del Babo Land Grant Board of Trustees. When the land was granted in 1967, the park was now 67 acres which included 4,800 feet of river access from the park. Later, 3.5 miles of the Pecos River was opened to the public from the park.

State marker inscription 
"Couched between high red sandstone bluffs in a beautiful valley of the Pecos River, this park is located near the picturesque Spanish colonial village of Villanueva. The park offers hiking trails with historical markers and camping/picnicking sites"

Geology 
Outcrops in the park are of the Recent, Late Pleistocene, and Permian ages. The earliest rocks form the base of the 300 to 500-foot-high cliffs of Glorieta Mesa and were conveyed during the Middle to Late Permian period, around 268-245 million years ago. The earliest rocks belonging to the Permian Yeso Formation formthe lower slopes below the cliffs, withslender bands containinglocalized layers of red-orange calcareous siltstone and dolomitelimestone up to15 feet thick. It consists of alternating layers offine-grained to medium-grained calcareous quartzsandstone.

References

External links
 Villanueva State Park

State parks of New Mexico
Parks in San Miguel County, New Mexico
Protected areas established in 1967